Meadows is an unincorporated community in Stokes County, North Carolina, United States, about four miles southeast of the county seat, Danbury, on North Carolina State Highway 8.

Unincorporated communities in Stokes County, North Carolina
Unincorporated communities in North Carolina